Loachapoka is a town in Lee County, Alabama, United States. The population was 180 as of the 2010 census. It is part of the Auburn metropolitan area.

The name "Loachapoka" means "turtle killing place" in Muskogee, with locha meaning "turtle" and poga meaning "killing place." In literature, Lochapoka was the destination of the colonists in James H. Street's 1940 novel Oh, Promised Land.

Loachapoka is the location of the first Rosenwald School.

Government 
Loachapoka is governed by a mayor and 5 town council members. However, in the most recent municipal election (2016), no incumbents submitted qualifying paperwork to run for re-election. Therefore, the only citizen that did qualify for the ballot became mayor-elect, as per state law, and this was confirmed by the AL Director of Elections. When the mayor-elect brought the issue to light, several town, county and state officials worked together in a poorly hatched plan to improperly disqualify the only candidate to follow the law for qualification, as referenced in several newspaper articles and audio recordings of town hall meetings. The corruption portrayed in this series of events reflect a pattern of politics in Alabama that has been commonplace for many years, as reported in the Harvard Political Review.

History
Loachapoka was a Creek Indian town for some decades prior to white settlement. In the last census prior to the Native removal to Oklahoma, Loachapoka was found to have a population of 564. Upon settlement by Euro-Americans, Loachapoka—temporarily renamed Ball's Fork—became the regional trade center, a position that was reinforced in 1845 when it became the easternmost point on the railroad to Montgomery. Loachapoka's influence peaked in the early 1870s, when her population reached nearly 1,300. Within a few years, a collapse of trade due to the Panic of 1873 and additional rail lines in the area sent Loachapoka into economic decline. Loachapoka roughly stabilized as a small farming community by the mid-20th century, and by the early 2000s (decade) had become a small-town suburb of Auburn. The mayor of Loachapoka is Zach Holmes.

Culture

Loachapoka was home to two fall festivals, both held on the same day each fall—the annual Syrup Sopping Day [to the South of Highway 14] and the Lee County Historical Fair [at Pioneer Park, to the north of Highway 14.] Many fairgoers were not aware of the fact that they are actually attending two celebrations of area history.  The Syrup Sop featured the making of syrup in traditional methods from sorghum and ribbon cane.  The Historical Fair featured life in the 1850s in east central Alabama.  The two festivals were combined into one named Pioneer Day. Combined, the two events attract more than 20,000 people to Loachapoka annually.  Loachapoaka is the home town of country music singer Freddie Hart.

The Lee County Historical Society Museum is located in an 1845 general store in the Loachapoka historic district, located at "Pioneer Park," a six and-a-half-acre park of 9 buildings and 5 gardens reminiscent of the 1850s in east central Alabama.

Photo gallery

Geography
Loachapoka is located at  (32.604844, -85.596890).

Demographics

Loachapoka has appeared sporadically on census records. It first appeared as a separate community on the 1880 U.S. Census and again in 1890. It did not appear in 1900–1920, although one source said it did incorporate in 1910 with 359 residents, but this is not corroborated by the census of that year. In 1930, it appeared again, citing it had been incorporated in 1926. However, it failed to appear again in 1940, presumably losing its charter during the 1930s. It did not reincorporate again until 1974.

As of the census of 2000, there were 165 people, 69 households, and 46 families residing in the town. The racial makeup of the town was 61.21% Black or African American, 38.18% White and 0.61% Asian. 0.61% of the population were Hispanic or Latino of any race.

There were 69 households, out of which 20.3% had children under the age of 18 living with them, 37.7% were married couples living together, 18.8% had a female householder with no husband present, and 31.9% were non-families. 24.6% of all households were made up of individuals, and 10.1% had someone living alone who was 65 years of age or older. The average household size was 2.39 and the average family size was 2.81.

In the town, the population was spread out, with 18.8% under the age of 18, 14.5% from 18 to 24, 31.5% from 25 to 44, 21.8% from 45 to 64, and 13.3% who were 65 years of age or older. The median age was 37 years. For every 100 females, there were 91.9 males. For every 100 females age 18 and over, there were 97.1 males.

The median income for a household in the town was $30,938, and the median income for a family was $33,571. Males had a median income of $28,750 versus $28,500 for females. The per capita income for the town was $14,477. About 9.5% of families and 16.3% of the population were below the poverty line, including 18.5% of those under the age of eighteen and 20.0% of those 65 or over.

Notable person
Freddie Hart, country music singer and songwriter

References

Historic Chattahoochee Commission (1978). Boom and Change. Historic Marker, Loachapoka, Ala.
Nunn, Alexander (Ed.) (1983). Lee County and Her Forebears. Montgomery, Ala., Herff Jones. LCCCN 83-081693
Schafer, Elizabeth. Loachapoka, Alabama. Retrieved September 25, 2005.
Wright, John Peavy (1969). Glimpses into the past from my Grandfather's Trunk. Alexander City, Ala., Outlook Publishing Company, Inc. LCCCN 74-101331

External links

Towns in Lee County, Alabama
Towns in Alabama
Columbus metropolitan area, Georgia
Auburn metropolitan area, Alabama
Alabama placenames of Native American origin